The Central Arcade in Newcastle upon Tyne, England, is an Edwardian shopping arcade built in 1906 and designed by Oswald and Son, of Newcastle. It is in the Central Exchange building, which was built by Richard Grainger in 1836–38 to the designs of John Wardle and George Walker.

The Central Exchange is a triangular building which was intended to be a corn exchange but became a subscription newsroom. In 1870 the Institution for Promoting the Fine Arts converted the news room into an art gallery, concert hall and theatre.

This was replaced by a vaudeville theatre in 1897, but in 1901 the interior was destroyed by fire, after which the current Central Arcade was built within the walls of the original building. According to one source the faïence tiles in the arcade were produced by Rust's Vitreous Mosaics, Battersea, but a book on Burmantofts Pottery states that this arcade was their last major work in external faience in 1906.

The building is Grade II* listed.

References

External links 

Buildings and structures in Newcastle upon Tyne
Shopping arcades in England
Shopping malls established in 1906
Grade II* listed buildings in Tyne and Wear
1906 establishments in England
Triangulaire